Franco Balducci (23 November 1922 – 7 June 2001) was an Italian film actor. He appeared in 75 films between 1947 and 1978. He was born in Umbria, Italy.

Selected filmography

 Bullet for Stefano (1947) - Giacomo
 Tempesta su Parigi (1948)
 Les Misérables (1948) - (uncredited)
 Il monello della strada (1950) - Arizona Bill
 The Crossroads (1951)
 Lorenzaccio (1951)
 The Captain of Venice (1951)
 Stranger on the Prowl (1952) - Morelli
 Milady and the Musketeers (1952)
 Son of the Hunchback (1952)
 Le marchand de Venise (1953)
 Mystery of the Black Jungle (1954) - Kammamuri
 The Captain of Venice (1954) - Marin Soldero
 Black Devils of Kali (1954) - Kammamuri
 I cinque dell'Adamello (1954) - Renato
 Honey degli uomini perduti (1956)
 Ciao, pais... (1956) - Amleto
 Nights of Cabiria (1957) - Spectator on the Stage of the Cinema (uncredited)
 La grande ombra (1957) - Ranuccio
 Amarti è il mio destino (1957) - Piero
 L'uomo dai calzoni corti (1958)
 Arrivederci Firenze (1958) - Luca
 Head of a Tyrant (1959) - Galaad
 You're on Your Own (1959)
 Bad Girls Don't Cry (1959) - Eliseo
 La sceriffa (1960) - Jimmy Jesse's Brother (uncredited)
 The Conqueror of the Orient (1960) - Nureddin - Nadir's Companion
 The Hunchback of Rome (1960) - Pallaccia
 Two Women (1960) - Il tedesco nel pagliaio
 The Lovemakers (1961) - Tognaccio
 Tiro al piccione (1961) - Garrani
 Duel of the Titans (1961) - Acilio
 Caccia all'uomo (1961)
 La bellezza di Ippolita (1962) - Beppo
 The Slave (1962) - Verus - ship's Commander
 La guerra continua (1962) - Conti
 I diavoli di Spartivento (1963)
 L'ultima carica (1964)
 Romeo and Juliet (1964) - Benvolio
 Pirates of Malaysia (1964) - Sambigliong
 Genoveffa di Brabante (1964) - Rambaldo
 Hercules and the Tyrants of Babylon (1964) - Mobsab / Behar - Tanit's Escort
 I Kill, You Kill (1965) - Alex (segment "Il Plenilunio")
 Doc, Hands of Steel (1965) - Sheriff
 Made in Italy (1965) - The Driver (segment "5 'La Famiglia', episode 3")
 Gli uomini dal passo pesante (1965) - Pete Wiley
 The Upper Hand (1966)
 Perry Grant, agente di ferro (1966) - Martin
 Sex Quartet (1966) - 1st Motorist (segment "Fata Sabina") (uncredited)
 Wanted (1967) - Cuzack
 Il tempo degli avvoltoi (1967) - Francisco
 Death Rides a Horse (1967) - Sceriffo
 Lola Colt (1967) - (uncredited)
 Day of Anger (1967) - Slim
 Django, Prepare a Coffin (1968) - Sheriff
 A Long Ride from Hell (1968) - Mason
 A Minute to Pray, a Second to Die (1968) - Kraut henchman
 A Sky Full of Stars for a Roof (1968) - Brent
 One on Top of the Other (1969) - Officer Loveday
 Night of the Serpent (1969) - Luciano
 Rosolino Paternò, soldato... (1970)
 Metello (1970) - Chellini
 A Man Called Sledge (1970) - Un carcerato
 No desearás al vecino del quinto (1970) - Fred Corleone
 Brancaleone at the Crusades (1970)
 A Lizard in a Woman's Skin (1971) - McKenna
 La supertestimone (1971) - Un detenuto
 Cross Current (1971) - Sante Foschi
 I due pezzi da 90 (1971)
 Non commettere atti impuri (1971)
 1870 (1972, TV Movie) - Remo Bezzi
 The Sicilian Checkmate (1972) - Gaetano
 Don't Torture a Duckling (1972) - Mr. Spriano - Michele's Father
 The Grand Duel (1972) - Bull's Friend
 Giordano Bruno (1973)
 Last Days of Mussolini (1974) - Franco Colombo
 The Suspect (1975) - Party Functionary with red shirt
 Libera, My Love (1975) - The police Commissioner
 Manhunt in the City (1975) - Alberto Pirazzini
 Destruction Force (1977) - Nino
 Black Journal (1977)
 Closed Circuit (1978, TV Movie) - Aldo Capocci (final film role)

References

External links

1922 births
2001 deaths
People from the Province of Perugia
Italian male film actors
20th-century Italian male actors